Dubicze Cerkiewne  (Dubíčy Cerkéŭnè) is a village in Hajnówka County, Podlaskie Voivodeship, in north-eastern Poland, close to the border with Belarus. It is the seat of the gmina (administrative district) called Gmina Dubicze Cerkiewne.

The village has a population of approximately 1,900.

References

Villages in Hajnówka County